Anthony C. Settles (born August 29, 1964) is a former American football linebacker in the National Football League for the Washington Redskins.  He played high school football at Scotland High School in Laurinburg, North Carolina. Settles then went on to play college football for the Elon University Phoenix in North Carolina.  He was a free-agent and was signed to the Redskins during a strike in 1987. He played in three games and was featured in "The Year of Scab" documentary by ESPN.

References

1964 births
Living people
People from Laurinburg, North Carolina
American football linebackers
Elon Phoenix football players
Washington Redskins players